Nusalala tessellata is a species of insect from the genus Nusalala. It has been known to prey upon Bemisia tabaci.

Range 
The species has been observed in the Neotropical realm of South America, Middle America (Americas) and the Caribbean.

References

Insects of Central America
Insects described in 1888
Hemerobiiformia